Seafarers' Identity Documents Convention, 1958 is  an International Labour Organization Convention.

It was established in 1958, with the preamble stating:
Having decided upon the adoption of certain proposals with regard to the reciprocal or international recognition of seafarers' national identity cards,...

An identity document issued under the convention or its successor is colloquially called a Seaman's Book or a Seaman's Card.

Modifications 
The convention was subsequently revised in 2003 by Convention C185 Seafarers' Identity Documents Convention (Revised), 2003

Ratifications
As of January 2023, the convention had been ratified by 64 states. Eleven of the ratifying states have automatically denounced the convention by their subsequent acceptance of conventions that trigger denunciation.

References

External links 
Text.
Ratifications.

International Labour Organization conventions
Treaties concluded in 1958
Treaties entered into force in 1961
Identity documents
Treaties of the People's Republic of Angola
Treaties of Algeria
Treaties of Antigua and Barbuda
Treaties of Barbados
Treaties of Belarus
Treaties of the People's Republic of Bulgaria
Treaties of Cameroon
Treaties of Canada
Treaties of Cuba
Treaties of the Czech Republic
Treaties of Denmark
Treaties of Djibouti
Treaties of Dominica
Treaties of Estonia
Treaties of Fiji
Treaties of Finland
Treaties of Ghana
Treaties of the Kingdom of Greece
Treaties of Grenada
Treaties of Guatemala
Treaties of Guinea-Bissau
Treaties of Guyana
Treaties of Honduras
Treaties of Iceland
Treaties of India
Treaties of Pahlavi Iran
Treaties of Ba'athist Iraq
Treaties of Ireland
Treaties of Italy
Treaties of Kyrgyzstan
Treaties of Latvia
Treaties of Lithuania
Treaties of Liberia
Treaties of Malta
Treaties of Mauritius
Treaties of Mexico
Treaties of Morocco
Treaties of Norway
Treaties of Panama
Treaties of Poland
Treaties of the Estado Novo (Portugal)
Treaties of the Socialist Republic of Romania
Treaties of Saint Lucia
Treaties of Saint Vincent and the Grenadines
Treaties of Seychelles
Treaties of Slovenia
Treaties of the Solomon Islands
Treaties of Sri Lanka
Treaties of Sweden
Treaties of Tanganyika
Treaties of Tunisia
Treaties of Turkey
Treaties of the Ukrainian Soviet Socialist Republic
Treaties of the United Kingdom
Treaties of Uruguay
Admiralty law treaties
1958 in labor relations